The leader of the Labour Party is the highest-ranked political position within the New Zealand Labour Party, who serves as the parliamentary leader and leading spokesperson of the party. The current leader is Chris Hipkins, after Jacinda Ardern resigned.

History
The post of leader of the Labour Party was officially created upon the party's inception in 1916, though the title "leader" was often substituted and/or complemented with the title "chairman". At the 1935 election, Michael Joseph Savage led the Labour Party to victory, becoming the first Labour prime minister. In 1963, Arnold Nordmeyer became the first New Zealand-born leader of the party; three previous leaders had been born in Australia and one each in England and Scotland. The most electorally successful Labour leader to date is Helen Clark, who won three elections, in 1999, 2002 and 2005. Clark is also the party's longest-serving leader, having served for 14 years, 346 days between 1993 and 2008. Peter Fraser is the longest-serving Labour prime minister, serving 9 years, 261 days between 1940 and 1949.

Selection
A leadership candidate must be a member of parliament (MP). A new leader is elected whenever a vacancy arises, whether due to resignation, incapacitation, or following a motion of no confidence by the parliamentary caucus.

The current election rules were adopted in 2021, replacing earlier rules adopted in 2012. Candidates need 10% of the caucus to nominate. The caucus votes via exhaustive ballot (absent MPs can vote by proxy), and a candidate requires the support of two-thirds of the caucus to be elected. If no one can get two-thirds the candidate with the fewest votes is eliminated. If there are two candidates left and neither got two-thirds, there may be multiple rounds of voting to identify a consensus candidate. If one cannot be found then the leadership is determined by an electoral college comprising the caucus (40% of the total vote), party members (40%) and affiliated trade unions (20%). 

No later than three months following a general election, there must be a caucus vote to endorse the leader. If they fail to receive endorsement then the position of party leader is vacated and an election is triggered.

Role
When the Labour Party forms the Parliamentary Opposition, the leader of the party usually acts as the leader of the Opposition, and chairs a Shadow Cabinet. Likewise, when the party is in Government, as it currently is, the leader typically becomes the prime minister.

Unique to Labour, the party's caucus possesses the right to elect MPs to Cabinet, rather than the leader choosing them. The practice began following the 1940 leadership election. Michael Joseph Savage was the only leader to solely appoint his own cabinet following the election victories in 1935 and 1938.

List of leaders

The following is a complete list of Labour Party leaders (including acting leaders):

Key:

PM: Prime Minister
LO: Leader of the Opposition
†: Died in office

See also
Deputy Leader of the New Zealand Labour Party
Leader of the New Zealand National Party
:Category:New Zealand Labour Party leadership elections

References

New Zealand Labour Party
Political office-holders in New Zealand
New Zealand Labour Party
New Zealand politics-related lists